Nizhneye Kazanishche (Töben Qazanış) is a rural locality (a selo) in Buynaksky District, Republic of Dagestan, Russia. The population was 12,871 as of 2010. There are 162 streets.

Geography 
Nizhneye Kazanishche is located 9 km southeast of Buynaksk (the district's administrative centre) by road, on the Buraganozen River. Buglen and Atlanaul are the nearest rural localities.

See also 

 Bulach Tatu

References 

Rural localities in Buynaksky District